Peacehaven Community School is a mixed secondary school for 11 to 16-year-olds in Peacehaven, East Sussex in the United Kingdom.

The school was opened in 2001 following a 40-year campaign by the local community for a secondary school in Peacehaven.

It is an Academy administered and governed by the Swale Academies Trust, a status it gained in September 2019. The current Head of School was Darren Warner-Swan with Liza Leung as Executive Headteacher on behalf of the Trust.

Previously, it was a foundation school administered by East Sussex County Council and the Peacehaven Co-operative Learning Trust. With governance of the school being undertaken by an Interim Executive Board between 2013 until 2018.

Ofsted inspections 

The school was inspected by Ofsted in 2013 and again in 2016. For both inspections, the school was awarded a grade 3 or 'requires improvement' mark overall, despite previously being a 'good' school. This was reflected in the then-latest exam results, released in August 2016, which showed only 38% of students achieving 5 A*-C GCSEs (or equivalent) inc. English and maths compared to the 53% national average. This was 4 points down on the previous year from 42%, despite local authority intervention in the governance of the school and consultation and guidance of the Swale Academies Trust.

It was once again inspected in October 2018, and was awarded a grade 2 or 'good' mark overall.

Following the academisation of the school, it has not yet had another inspection.

Academy Conversion Controversy 
Prior to being converted to Academy status, parents and teachers went on strike in opposition over the plans, citing concerns such as a gender pay gap at the Swale Academies Trust and the way in which the conversion was imposed upon the school by an Interim Education Board, garnering national press attention.

East Sussex County Council and the Interim Education Board defended their decision, arguing "It remains our view and view of the Interim Executive Board (IEB) that this is the right course of action to secure strong leadership and continued improvements at the school."

Local MP Lloyd Russell-Moyle also campaigned heavily against academisation.

Nevertheless, the academisation process was completed in September 2019.

References

External links
 School website.
 Ofsted report
 Government Figures
 2008 Ofsted

Secondary schools in East Sussex
Educational institutions established in 2001
2001 establishments in England
Academies in East Sussex